This is a list of the National Register of Historic Places listings in Medina County, Texas.

This is intended to be a complete list of properties and districts listed on the National Register of Historic Places in Medina County, Texas. There are two districts and seven individual properties listed on the National Register in the county. One district includes an individually listed property that is also a State Historic Site, State Antiquities Landmark (SAL), and a Recorded Texas Historic Landmark (RTHL). This district contains several other RTHLs while properties elsewhere in the county include one more SAL and RTHL.

Current listings

The locations of National Register properties and districts may be seen in a mapping service provided.

|}

See also

National Register of Historic Places listings in Texas
List of Texas State Historic Sites
Recorded Texas Historic Landmarks in Medina County

References

External links

Medina County, Texas
Medina County
Buildings and structures in Medina County, Texas